Kevin Douglas Valenzuela Fuentes (born 30 July 1993) is a Chilean footballer that currently plays for Ñublense of the Primera B de Chile.

Club career
He began his career at Santiago Wanderers youth set-up and was the team’s first captain in won the Youth Primera División championship. In 2013 after being promoted the first-adult team in January, he debuted in a 1–0 away loss with Rangers at Estadio Fiscal de Talca on 5 May.

References

External links
 

1993 births
Living people
Chilean footballers
Chilean Primera División players
Santiago Wanderers footballers
Association football midfielders